Hills Grove is a small unincorporated community in eastern Surry County, North Carolina, United States. The community lies between Westfield and the town of Pilot Mountain near the Stokes County line. Prominent landmarks in the community include Hill's Presbyterian Church.

Unincorporated communities in Surry County, North Carolina
Unincorporated communities in North Carolina